Giovanni Battista Pescetti (c. 170420 March 1766) was an organist, harpsichordist, and composer known primarily for his operas and keyboard sonatas. Musicologist and University of California, Santa Barbara professor John E. Gillespie wrote that Pescetti "stylistically stands as a bridge between Alberti and Domenico Scarlatti".

Life
Born in Venice, Pescetti was the son of organ builder Giacinto Pescetti. His mother, Giulia Pescetti (née Pollarolo), was the daughter of opera composer and organist Carlo Francesco Pollarolo and the sister of composer and organist Antonio Pollarolo. He studied in his native city under the organist and opera composer Antonio Lotti. He developed a friendship with Baldassare Galuppi, a fellow pupil of Lotti's, with whom he collaborated in creating and revising operas. From 1725 to 1732 he wrote operas for various theatres in Venice, sometimes in collaboration with Galuppi.

Pescetti left Italy for London in 1736, where he initially worked as a harpsichordist. He replaced Nicola Porpora as director of the Opera of the Nobility in 1737. In London, the opera singer Giovanni Manzuoli championed his music and became a close friend of his. In 1739 he published a set of ten keyboard sonatas entitled Sonate per gravicembalo in London. This work included arrangements of the overture and arias in his opera La conquista del velo d’oro. While stylistically his work exists inbetween that of Alberti and Scarlatti, some of his music displayed the influence of his London contemporary George Frideric Handel.

Pescetti probably left London around 1745 when hostility against Catholic Italians arose because of the Jacobite rebellion of Prince Charles and the Highland clans. He returned to Venice in 1747 and in 1762 was appointed second organist at St Mark's Basilica. He died in Venice on March 20, 1766.

Pescetti was active as a teacher of composition in Venice, his most famous students being Josef Mysliveček (1737–1781) and Antonio Salieri (1750–1825).

Sonata in C minor

The Sonata in C minor was transcribed for harp by Carlos Salzedo. The right hand now plays the melody again and continues on, transposing to G major, going through a short development and then ending in G. The melody repeats, then goes to a second section starting in E-flat major. This section follows the same structure—melody in right hand, melody in left hand, melody in right hand, transposes back to C minor, goes through the same development and then ends in C minor. The second section repeats again and the movement ends.

The second movement in characterized by a quarter note melody embellished by grace notes with a triplet left-hand accompaniment.

The third movement (presto) begins with the three notes of the C minor triad in a C–G–C–E-flat pattern. This upwards moving passage then moves down from E-flat to C then repeats the opening pattern with different notes, D–G–D–F and then descends from F to D and then returns to E-flat. In order to complete this opening passage there is a downwards scale from E-flat to C and then leave the opening in a state of resolution, there is a final four note pattern, B-natural–C–D and finally to G, the dominant. This is then repeated an octave lower. Throughout this, the left hand is playing short, staccato accompanying quarter notes whereas the right, which was discussed above, is playing eighth note tuplet. After the opening passage is complete, there is a series of broken C major chords one octave above from where the opening passage ended. Each of these broken chords are repeated twice, modulating from C major to F minor to B-flat major and finally, to E-flat major. Once reaching E-flat major, the relative major of C minor, there is a downwards scale continuing until reaching G, an octave lower. From this point, a new pattern emerges, consisting of the three notes: F, G, A-flat and B-flat. The notes are arranged in a G–A-flat–B-flat F–G–A-flat pattern, which is repeated twice. After this pattern, a broken E-flat major tonic chord is played, followed by another downwards scale once again beginning on C and continuing to a low F. Following the scale is a final closing pattern, one which is not heard in again in the piece. The closing bar ends with a broken E-flat major chord beginning on G followed by the three notes C, A-flat, G and closes with an E-flat major cadence. (End of first part.)

References

Further reading
Degrada, Francesco. 1966. "Le sonate per cembalo e per organo di Giovanni Battista Pescetti". Chigiana (new series) 3:89–108.

Taylor, Carole M. 1987. "From Losses to Lawsuit: Patronage of the Italian Opera in London by Lord Middlesex, 1739–45". Music & Letters 68:1–25.

External links
 

Italian male classical composers
Italian classical organists
Male classical organists
Italian Baroque composers
1700s births
1766 deaths
18th-century Italian composers
18th-century Italian male musicians
18th-century keyboardists